Mill Hill is a mountain in Barnstable County, Massachusetts. Grassy Nook is located southwest of Mill Hill.

References

Mountains of Massachusetts
Mountains of Barnstable County, Massachusetts